Hannah Dunne (born ) is an American actress and model. She is the daughter of actors Griffin Dunne and Carey Lowell, the granddaughter of writer and journalist Dominick Dunne and the niece of actress Dominique Dunne. She is best known for her portrayal of Lizzie Campbell in the Amazon TV series Mozart in the Jungle.

Filmography

References

External links

1990 births
21st-century American actresses
Living people
Place of birth missing (living people)
American television actresses
American film actresses
American web series actresses